You Were Never Really Here (released as A Beautiful Day in France and Germany) is a 2017 neo-noir crime psychological thriller film written and directed by Lynne Ramsay. Based on the 2013 novella of the same name by Jonathan Ames, it stars Joaquin Phoenix, Ekaterina Samsonov, Alex Manette, John Doman, and Judith Roberts. In the film, a traumatized mercenary named Joe (Phoenix) is hired by a politician to find and rescue his daughter who has been kidnapped by a human trafficking network, which Joe is instructed to destroy by any violent means. The film was co-produced between the United Kingdom, France and the United States.

An early cut premiered at the 2017 Cannes Film Festival in competition, where Ramsay won the award for Best Screenplay and Phoenix the award for Best Actor. The film was released by StudioCanal in the UK, on 9 March 2018, and by Amazon Studios in the U.S., where it began a limited release in Los Angeles and New York on 6 April 2018, and a wide release on 20 April. It received critical acclaim, with Ramsay's direction and Phoenix's performance garnering high praise.

Plot 
Joe is a traumatized hired gun who specializes in rescuing trafficked girls, using brutal methods against their captors. He cares for his elderly mother in his childhood home in New York City. Joe has flashbacks of the abuse he and his mother faced from his violent father, and his brutal past in the military and FBI, and is troubled by suicidal thoughts.

As he comes home one night, Joe is seen by Moises, the son of Angel, who acts as middleman between Joe and his handler, John McCleary. Joe tells McCleary that Angel knows his address and may pose a security risk. McCleary assigns Joe a new job from Albert Votto, a New York State Senator. Votto has offered a large sum of money to discreetly rescue his abducted daughter, Nina. He gives Joe the address of a brothel for wealthy patrons sent via an anonymous text. Joe stakes out the brothel, kills several security guards and patrons, and rescues Nina. While Joe and Nina await Votto's arrival in a hotel room, the news reports that Votto has committed suicide. Police officers gain access to the room with the help of the desk clerk, kill the clerk, and take Nina. Joe escapes after killing an officer sent to kill him.

Joe finds that government agents killed McCleary, Angel, and Moises while searching for Joe's address. Arriving back at his home, Joe discovers that two agents have murdered his mother and have been waiting for him. He kills one agent and mortally wounds the other. This agent says that Governor Williams is directing the authorities to cover up the trafficking and Nina is Williams's favorite. Joe drives to a forest, fills his pockets with stones, and gives his mother a water burial. As he sinks into the water, he has a vision of Nina. Joe removes the stones from his pockets and swims back to the surface.

Joe follows Williams to his country home and fights his way in, only to discover Williams with his throat slit. He searches the house and discovers Nina, who is seated at a dining room table, alongside a bloody straight razor. Although Joe has become increasingly upset, Nina reassures him that she is alright. The two go to a diner to discuss their future. Joe has a violent suicidal fantasy and passes out. Nina wakes him, saying, "It's a beautiful day." He agrees, and they leave together.

Cast
 Joaquin Phoenix as Joe
 Dante Pereira-Olson as Young Joe
 Ekaterina Samsonov as Nina Votto
 Alex Manette as Senator Albert Votto
 John Doman as John McCleary
 Judith Roberts as Joe's Mother
 Alessandro Nivola as Governor Williams
 Frank Pando as Angel
 Vinicius Damasceno as Moises

Production

On 11 May 2016, it was reported that Lynne Ramsay would write and direct an adaptation of Jonathan Ames' novella You Were Never Really Here, starring Joaquin Phoenix. The project would be shopped to Cannes buyers. Although it was initially reported that A24 had acquired the project, Amazon Studios bought U.S. rights to You Were Never Really Here on 13 May 2016. Principal photography took place during August 2016 in and around New York City. Some interior scenes were shot at Kaufman Astoria Studios. On 2 May 2017, it was confirmed that composer Jonny Greenwood would score the film. The film was still a work in progress when it premiered at the Cannes Film Festival on 27 May 2017.

Reception

Critical response
The website's critical consensus reads, "Bracingly elevated by a typically committed lead performance from Joaquin Phoenix, You Were Never Really Here confirms writer-director Lynne Ramsay as one of modern cinema's most unique—and uncompromising—voices." On Metacritic, the film has a weighted average score of 84 out of 100, based on 41 critics, indicating "universal acclaim".

Sheila O'Malley of RogerEbert.com gave the film 4 out of 4 stars, saying that the film "is a taut and almost unbearably intense 90-minutes, without an ounce of fat on it. Ramsay doesn't give you a second to breathe." Guy Lodge for Variety said Ramsay may be the world's "greatest working filmmaker," and called the film "astonishing... a stark, sinewy, slashed-to-the-bone hitman thriller far more concerned with the man than the hit."

Critics Leah Pickett and Abraham Raphael noted similarities between You Were Never Really Here and the 1976 film Taxi Driver with both films involving friendships between an adult male and a child victim of prostitution and exploring the seedy underworld of New York City.

Accolades

References

External links
 
 
 
 You Were Never Really Here at the BFI

2010s English-language films
2017 drama films
2017 films
2017 thriller drama films
Amazon Studios films
American mystery films
British mystery films
British thriller drama films
British vigilante films
English-language French films
Film4 Productions films
2017 independent films
Films about child prostitution
Films about prostitution in the United States
Films directed by Lynne Ramsay
Films scored by Jonny Greenwood
Films set in New York City
Films shot in New Jersey
Films shot in New York City
French mystery films
French thriller drama films
American thriller drama films
2010s American films
2010s British films
2010s French films
2010s vigilante films